The men's middleweight event was part of the weightlifting programme at the 1932 Summer Olympics. The weight class was the third-lightest contested, and allowed weightlifters of up to 75 kilograms (165 pounds). The competition was held on Sunday, 31 July 1932. Seven weightlifters from six nations competed.

Medalists

Records
These were the standing world and Olympic records (in kilograms) prior to the 1932 Summer Olympics.

Karl Hipfinger set a new Olympic record in snatch with 107.5 kilograms and in clean and jerk with 140 kilograms. Rudolf Ismayr set a new Olympic record in total with 345 kilograms.

Results

All figures in kilograms.

References

Sources
 Olympic Report
 

Middleweight